The International Association of Exhibition and Events (IAEE) is a non-profit professional organization that represents the interests of trade show and exposition management.

Founded in 1928 as the National Association for Exposition Management, it has over 7000 members in 15 chapters worldwide.  Chapters include:
 Persian Gulf Chapter
 Atlanta/Southeastern Chapter
 Central Texas Chapter
 Dallas/Fort Worth Chapter
 Florida Chapter
 Michigan Chapter
 Midwestern Chapter 
 New England Chapter
 New York Chapter
 Northern California Chapter
 Ohio Valley Chapter
 Rocky Mountain Chapter
 Southwest Chapter
 UNLV Student Chapter
 Washington DC Chapter 

On November 30, 2006, IAEE changed its name to the International Association for Exhibition and Events. (IAEE).  IAEE holds an annual meeting, known as Expo! Expo!, during the fourth quarter of the year.  The 2007 Annual Meeting was held at the Mandalay Bay Convention Center in Las Vegas, NV on December 10-12.

IAEM is headquartered in Dallas, Texas

External links
Official website

Organizations established in 1928
Organizations based in Dallas